DXQM (98.7 FM), broadcasting as DWIZ 98.7, is a radio station owned and operated by Aliw Broadcasting Corporation. The station's studio is located at ATU Plaza Commercial Mall, Gov. Duterte St., Davao City, and its transmitter is located at Broadcast Avenue, Shrine Hills, Matina, Davao City.

The station was formerly under the Home Radio network from its inception in 1992 to January 16, 2023. In August 1, 2016, it was relaunched as a music and news station. On January 30, 2023, it, along with its provincial stations, was relaunched under the DWIZ network.

References

Aliw Broadcasting Corporation
Home Radio Network
Radio stations in Davao City
Adult contemporary radio stations in the Philippines
Radio stations established in 1992